Progress Live was the eighth concert tour by British pop group Take That. The tour, sponsored by Samsung, supported their sixth studio album, Progress as they visited major cities in the UK and Europe. It was the first tour to feature all five original members performing together in 16 years and the final tour to feature Jason Orange and Robbie Williams. In its infancy, the tour accomplished many accolades including selling 1.34 million tickets in less than 24 hours. The tour quickly became the biggest tour in the United Kingdom. They played 8 nights each at Etihad Stadium in Manchester and also Wembley Stadium in London – breaking the previous record held by Michael Jackson's Bad World Tour set in 1988. These eight nights at Wembley Stadium saw Take That break the record for the highest-grossing residency by grossing £38 million ($61 million) from their respective London dates alone. At the conclusion of 2011, the tour was placed on Billboard's annual, "Top 25 Tours", and appeared third worldwide, earning over $180 million with 29 shows. Each member of the band received £7,900,000 from the tour after tax.

Background
In early 2010, the media reported that Robbie Williams and Gary Barlow were recording a duet in Los Angeles, California. Since that announcement, numerous rumours emerged of Williams reuniting with the band. In July 2010, the band confirmed his joining and also announced that all five members were recording an album. The popularity of the tour surpassed their previous fest, which was viewed by over 600,000 spectators.

Opening acts
Pet Shop Boys

Setlist
Take That (four-piece)
"Rule the World"
"Greatest Day"
"Hold Up a Light"
"Patience"
"Shine" (contains elements of "Mr. Blue Sky")
Robbie Williams
"Let Me Entertain You" (contains elements of "Sgt. Pepper's Lonely Hearts Club Band")
"Rock DJ"
"Come Undone" (contains elements of "Walk on the Wild Side" and excerpts from "Greatest Day")
"Feel"
"Angels"
Take That (original lineup)
"The Flood"
"SOS"
"Underground Machine"
"Kidz" (contains elements of "Rudebox" and "Clap Your Hands Now")
"Pretty Things"
 When They Were Young Medley ("A Million Love Songs" / "Babe" / "Everything Changes")
"Back for Good"
"Pray"
"Love Love" (contains elements of "Happy Now")
"Never Forget"

Encore
"No Regrets" / "Relight My Fire"
"Eight Letters"

Tour dates

|colspan="4"|TOTAL
|1,806,473 / 1,806,473 (100%)
|$185,175,360
|-
|}

Cancellations and rescheduled shows

Band
Musical Director, Keys, Guitar, Sax: Mike Stevens
Guitars: Gary Nuttall, Milton McDonald
Bass Guitar: Lee Pomeroy
Drums: Donavan Hepburn
Keyboards: Jamie Norton, Bernie Smith

Home media
Progress Live was filmed on 10 and 11 June 2011 at Etihad Stadium in Manchester
 and was released on DVD and Blu-ray on 21 November 2011.

A 'highlight' version of the concert was broadcast on BBC1 on 18 December 2011.

Critical response
The tour had a positive reaction from critics, media and fans alike. Sky News praised the show commenting that "Take That [had] lived up to the hype surrounding their reunion with Robbie Williams as they kicked off their sell-out tour." Dave Simpson of The Guardian bestowed the highest award of 5 stars to the tour as he praised the achievement of the group by stating "Grins and a group hug later, the band upstaged their jawdropping visuals with the sight of five men performing the classic pop anthems that made them – Pray, Relight My Fire, and Back For Good – and dancing and smiling like they'd never been away." He ended his review by commenting that when "the quintet sang 'Never Forget' in front of an illuminated robot so tall it towered above the stadium, it felt like that almost mythical event: a once in a lifetime pop experience."

Show incidents
Mark Owen and Howard Donald were both trapped on a stage robot during a concert at Etihad Stadium in Manchester on 4 June 2011. The pair were meant to be lowered to the stage on the palms of the group's giant robot man, Om, but the mechanics failed. Consequently, they were stuck singing "Love Love" three metres (10 ft) above the rest of the band. Ladders were used to rescue Mark Owen so he could continue his performance. Howard Donald was forced to sing lead vocals for the next track, "Never Forget", his only solo performance, while still stuck on the robot before being helped down himself. A statement from the group read: "The mechanical man did stop in motion at the end of Love Love but the matter was resolved and by the end of the show he was standing tall again. Howard Donald was stuck singing Never Forget on a mechanical robot. There is no guarantee that with a mechanical structure the size of Om, there will be no recurrence at some point but all seems fine now."

During the 2011 Progress Tour, 15 July concert at the sold-out Parken Stadium in Copenhagen, Denmark was cancelled only a few hours before the beginning of the show. It was announced that Robbie Williams had caught a severe stomach infection, and was (in spite of treatment attempts) advised by doctors not to go on stage. Take That therefore decided to cancel the event, feeling the fans would not be satisfied with not having Williams on stage. This was the first time Take That had ever cancelled a concert.

Charts
Progress Live was released on DVD and Blu-ray throughout Europe beginning on 19 November 2011 and debuted at number 1 in the UK and Ireland, whilst also appearing at number 2 in Italy and Germany. 
On the first two days on sale in the UK the tour DVD sold "twice as much as the entire music DVD chart combined." The first week sales in the UK totalled 127,359, followed by a further 72,715 copies the next week.

Year-end charts

References

External links

 Take That's Official Website

Take That concert tours
2011 concert tours
May 2011 events in Europe
June 2011 events in Europe
July 2011 events in Europe